Jacqueline Byers is a Canadian actress. She starred on the CBS series Salvation.

Early life
Byers grew up in Mississauga, Ontario, where she attended Lorne Park Secondary School; she participated in school plays and was a star athlete on the lacrosse team. She attended Queen's University in Kingston where she received a Bachelor of Arts in acting and was also part of the school's Lacrosse Varsity team. She began her career at the age of 12, performing in local musical productions of Annie and Peter Pan.

Filmography

Film

Television

References

External links
 

Year of birth missing (living people)
Living people
Actresses from Toronto
Canadian television actresses
Canadian film actresses
21st-century Canadian actresses